Carried Along is the second album by American singer-songwriter Andrew Peterson, released in 2000.

Background
Peterson worked with Glenn Rosenstein, in the production of this album. Essential Records released the album on March 21, 2000.

Critical reception

Rating the album a four out of five at The Phantom Tollbooth, Janet Friesen states, "Andrew Peterson's music moves like a breath of fresh air weaving acoustical patterns with guitars, strings, tin whistles, and hammer dulcimars." Catherine E. Francis, giving the album a nine out of ten for Cross Rhythms, writes, "this set gives you 10 tracks of folk and country-tinged acoustic pop that is very easy on the ears." Awarding the album three stars from AllMusic, Ashleigh Kittle says, "The project features a strong folk sound, at times blended with pop influences."

Track listing

Chart performance

Personnel 
 Robert Beeson – executive producer
 John Catchings – cello (3–4, 9–10)
 Aubrey Haynie – mandolin, violin (10)
 Sam Levine – penny whistle (10)
 Ken Lewis – percussion (1–5, 7–10)
 Gary Paczosa – mixing
 Andrew Peterson – mandolin (10), vocals, acoustic guitar (1–3, 7), 12-string acoustic guitar (4, 9)
 Jamie Peterson – backing vocals
 Glenn Rosenstein – producer, electric guitar(1, 9)
 Cliff Young – executive producer
 Craig Young – bass guitar (1, 4–5, 7–10)
 Gabe Scott – vocals, acoustic guitar, accordion (6), hammered dulcimer (9)
 Chris McHugh – drums (1, 4–5, 9), percussion (8)
 Matt Rollings – piano (1, 6, 8), B3 (1–2, 4, 8–9)
 Barry Bales – upright bass (2–3, 6)
 Al Perkins – pedal steel guitar (5, 7)
 Ron Block – banjo (5, 7)

References

2000 albums
Andrew Peterson (musician) albums
Essential Records (Christian) albums